The TC 3256 or Timex Computer 3256 was a 1987 computer created by Timex of Portugal, a branch of Timex Corporation.

It was a third generation Sinclair ZX Spectrum compatible computer, with expanded capabilities and new TEC - Timex Extended Commands BASIC commands supporting the AY-3-8912 sound chip, RS-232 network and the 512x192 pixel high resolution graphic mode.

Besides the legacy Sinclair BASIC, the ROM included a word processor (Timeword),  Timex Extended Basic (with support for the Tenet network, floppy disks and RAM drive) and a CP/M terminal emulator.
RAM was expanded to 256kb.

At least one prototype was built, but the machine never reached the market due to Timex of Portugal shutting  down its production line before its release.

Technical specifications
CPU
Zilog Z80A 
ROM
  64K
16K Sinclair BASIC
16K Timeword text processor
16K Timex Extended Basic  (Tenet, disk, RAM drive)
16K CP/M terminal emulator
RAM
 256K
 208K RAM drive
48K base memory
Display 
 Timex SCLD chip instead of the Spectrum's ULA, offering additional screen modes:
 Text: 32×24 or 64x32 characters (8×8 pixels, rendered in graphics mode)
 Graphics: 256×192 pixels, 15 colours (two simultaneous colours - "attributes" - per 8×8 pixels, causing attribute clash)
 Dual Screen: (two 256×192 pixels screens can be placed in memory)
 A two color 512×192 mode
Sound
 Beeper (1 channel, 10 octaves and 10+ semitones via internal speaker)
 AY-3-8912

I/O
RS-232
Cartridge port
Tape audio in/out for external cassette tape storage
RF television out
Composite video monitor out
RGB monitor out
Kempston Joystick input
Storage
External cassette tape recorder
Disk Drive: TOS / CP/M

Keyboard
69 keys with cursors, numpad and function keys

See also 
Timex Sinclair
Timex Sinclair 2068

References

External links 
 Timex Computer World

ZX Spectrum clones
Home computers
Z80-based home computers
Portuguese inventions